Pleasant Hill is an unincorporated community located on County Route 38,  south of Parkersburg in Wood County, West Virginia, United States.

References

Unincorporated communities in Wood County, West Virginia
Unincorporated communities in West Virginia